Stanislav Vladimirovich Matyash (born 23 April 1991) is a Russian football striker. He plays for FC Yadro Saint Petersburg.

Playing career
Matyash joined Zenit's "Smena" academy and made his first youth team appearance in October 2007 against Lokomotiv Moscow. He scored his first goal for Zenit on 31 October 2008 against Khimki. During the 2010 youth season, Matyash was the second highest top-scorer with 13 goals behind Mantas Savėnas of Sibir Novosibirsk.

While representing Zenit at the 2011 Commonwealth of Independent States Cup, he scored a double against HJK Helsinki in the quarterfinal round.

International career
Matyash made his debut for the Russian U-19 team during the 2010 UEFA Euro U-19 qualification against Latvia. He scored his first goal for Russia in a 6-0 victory over Liechtenstein on 25 October 2009.

References

External links

  Profile at the official FC Zenit St. Petersburg website
 Profile at the official FC Zenit St. Petersburg website
 

1991 births
People from Kremenchuk
Living people
Russian footballers
Russia youth international footballers
FC Volgar Astrakhan players
Russian Premier League players
FC Amkar Perm players
FC Dynamo Saint Petersburg players
FC Tekstilshchik Ivanovo players
FC Yenisey Krasnoyarsk players
FC Tyumen players
Association football forwards
FC Neftekhimik Nizhnekamsk players
FC Zenit Saint Petersburg players